Frederick Steiwer (October 13, 1883February 3, 1939) was an American politician and lawyer in the state of Oregon.

A native of the state, he was county district attorney and member of the Oregon State Senate from eastern Oregon and a veteran of World War I. A Republican, he was elected to the United States Senate and served from 1927 to 1938. Twice a candidate for the Republican nomination to the Presidency, he delivered the keynote address during the 1936 Republican National Convention.

Early life
Born in Oregon on a farm near Jefferson in Marion County, Steiwer's parents were John F. and Ada (née May) Steiwer. He received his education in the local public schools, and entered Oregon State Agricultural College (now Oregon State University) at Corvallis at age 15 in 1898 and graduated four years later with a Bachelor of Science degree in mechanical engineering. Steiwer then attended the University of Oregon in Eugene where he earned a Bachelor of Arts degree in 1906 before attending the school's law school, then located in Portland.

In 1908, he was admitted to the Oregon State Bar and began practicing law for the Portland firm Snow & McCamant, where he had already been employed. In March 1909, he left the firm and moved to eastern Oregon where he formed a partnership with G. W. Phelps in Pendleton. A member of the Masons and a farmer, he also joined the Phi Delta Phi legal fraternity.

Political career
Steiwer started his career in public office in 1909 as the deputy district attorney for Umatilla County, serving until 1910. In 1912, he was elected as the district attorney for the county and served until 1916. That year he was elected to the state senate as a Republican representing Umatilla County and District 20. Steiwer only served during the 1917 legislative session, resigning to enlist in the U.S. Army during the First World War. He served from 1917 to 1919 in the Sixty-fifth Field Artillery with rank of first lieutenant.

In 1926, Steiwer was elected as a Republican to the U.S. Senate, defeating incumbent Robert Stanfield in the primary. He won with only 39% of the vote, running against Democrat and later judge Bert Haney and Stanfield, then running for re-election as an independent. In 1928, he was one of many candidates for the Republican presidential nomination at the National Convention, with Herbert Hoover winning the nomination and then the fall election. At the 1936 Republican National Convention he was the keynote speaker and temporary chairman, as well as an unsuccessful candidate for the nomination. Steiwer was re-elected in 1932 and served from March 4, 1927 until January 31, 1938, when he resigned to return to the practice of law after suffering health problems. He had undergone gall bladder surgery in November 1936.

While in the Senate he was chairman of the Committee on Expenditures in Executive Departments (Seventy-second Congress). He also served on the Senate Judiciary Committee and helped oppose President Roosevelt's plan to pack the Supreme Court. Steiwer was an opponent of Roosevelt and The New Deal. In April 1937, he proposed an amendment to the U.S. Constitution to create a nationwide primary for selection of the candidates for the U.S. presidency and vice-presidency. No amendment was ever passed.

Later years and family
On December 12, 1911, he married Frieda Roesch in Pendleton, and they had two children. One daughter, named Elizabeth, had a son who married the daughter of Thomas J. Watson, Jr. of IBM fame. His uncle was Winlock W. Steiwer, a state senator. Upon leaving the Senate, he returned to the full-time practice of law in Washington, D.C., Steiwer died in the District of Columbia at the age of 55 on February 3, 1939, and was buried at Arlington National Cemetery in neighboring Arlington, Virginia.

See also
Knight Library

References

External links

1936 Keynote speech - Time magazine
Arlington National Cemetery

|-

|-

|-

1883 births
1939 deaths
United States Army personnel of World War I
District attorneys in Oregon
Oregon lawyers
Republican Party Oregon state senators
Oregon State University alumni
Republican Party United States senators from Oregon
United States Army officers
Candidates in the 1928 United States presidential election
Candidates in the 1936 United States presidential election
University of Oregon alumni
University of Oregon School of Law alumni
Burials at Arlington National Cemetery
Washington, D.C., Republicans
American Freemasons
20th-century American politicians
People from Marion County, Oregon
20th-century American lawyers
Military personnel from Oregon